Halil Asani (born 27 March 1974) is a Serbian former professional footballer who played as a defender.

Career
After playing for ČSK Čelarevo in the Second League of FR Yugoslavia, Asani was transferred to First League side Vojvodina in the 2001 winter transfer window. He made four appearances and scored one goal in the second half of the 2000–01 season. In the first half of the 2001–02 season, Asani appeared in four more games for Vojvodina, before returning to ČSK Čelarevo in the 2002 winter transfer window.

Between early 2002 and late 2012, Asani played for two clubs, ČSK Čelarevo and Proleter Novi Sad, spending five and a half seasons with each side.

Personal life
Asani is of Gorani descent. He is the father of fellow footballer Elmir Asani.

Honours
ČSK Čelarevo
 Serbian League Vojvodina: 1997–98
Proleter Novi Sad
 Serbian League Vojvodina: 2008–09

References

External links
 
 

Association football defenders
First League of Serbia and Montenegro players
FK ČSK Čelarevo players
FK Proleter Novi Sad players
FK Vojvodina players
Gorani people
People from Dragaš
RFK Novi Sad 1921 players
Serbia and Montenegro footballers
Serbian First League players
Serbian footballers
1974 births
Living people